Henry Lacey (31 May 1920 – 22 September 2011) was a South African cricketer. He played in twenty-one first-class matches from 1945/46 to 1956/57.

References

External links
 

1920 births
2011 deaths
South African cricketers
Border cricketers
Gauteng cricketers
Cricketers from Johannesburg